Mahinder Tak is an Indian-American radiation oncologist and retired US Army colonel. Tak was co-chair of the Democratic National Committee's Indo-American Council during the 2008 Obama campaign  She is also one of the largest private collectors of Indian art in the U.S.

References

American people of Indian descent
American Sikhs
People from Jammu and Kashmir
Living people
1946 births
Collectors of Asian art
American art collectors